Fairfield School can refer to:

Fairfield Grammar School, a closed school in Bristol, England
Fairfield High School (Bristol), a state secondary school in Bristol, England
Fairfield School (Dunedin), a school in Dunedin, New Zealand